CRI 91.9 FM is a radio station in Nairobi, Kenya. It is part of China Radio International (CRI). It broadcasts in English, Swahili and Mandarin. It launched on February 27, 2006.

Programming
The CRI programme schedule includes  "The Hot Pot Show" hosted by award-winning DJ Duggy Day is a music/entertainment programme which highlights the Chinese pop music scene, and showbiz world. Listeners can also hear about tourist attractions in China, and be kept up-to-date about happenings inside CRI's two official websites. Other regular programmes are "Music Safari" and "China Now".

References

External links

 CRI Beyond Beijing

Asian-Kenyan culture in Nairobi
China Radio International
Chinese diaspora in Africa
Mass media in Nairobi
Radio stations established in 2006
Radio stations in Kenya